Jean-Baptiste Manhès (4 February 1897 – 23 April 1963) was a French long-distance runner. He competed at the 1920 and 1924 Summer Olympics.

References

External links
 

1897 births
1963 deaths
French male long-distance runners
French male marathon runners
Olympic athletes of France
Athletes (track and field) at the 1920 Summer Olympics
Athletes (track and field) at the 1924 Summer Olympics
People from Alfortville
Sportspeople from Val-de-Marne